"Last Looks at the Lilacs" is a poem from Wallace Stevens's first book of poetry, Harmonium. It was first published in 1923 (in Secession 4, January).

Robert Buttel compares this poem to "The Plot Against the Giant" as concerning the humorous disparity between gauche male and suave female.
Robert A. Wilson makes a surprisingly plausible case (in a single-page article in The Wallace Stevens Journal, complete with an image of the label from a bottle of "Lilac Vegetal" after-shave lotion) for a connection between the poem and Stevens's experience at a barber shop.

Caliper'd reason, measuring everything but appreciating nothing, is contrasted unfavorably with well-booted imagination, as in Whitman's "When Lilacs Last in the Door-yard Bloom'd" or indeed the very poem under discussion. Lilacs can be connected to the fragrance of vegetal or to a cool night's fantastic star, but Stevens favors the latter and the final stanza shows why. Cook reports that "lilacs do not make Stevens happy" and reads the poem as blunt and atypical, comparing it to some of the more strained effects in The Comedian as the Letter C.

Notes

References 

 Buttel, R. Wallace Stevens: The Making of Harmonium. 1968: Princeton University Press.
 Bates, Milton. Wallace Stevens: A Mythology of Self.   1985: University of California Press.
 Cook, Eleanor. A Reader's Guide to Wallace Stevens. 2007: Princeton University Press.
 Wilson, Robert A. "A Note on 'Last Looks at the Lilacs'". The Wallace Stevens Journal. Volume 16 Number 2 (Fall 1992)

1923 poems
American poems
Poetry by Wallace Stevens